The Maspalomas bow-legged grasshopper (Dericorys minutus) is a species of grasshopper of the family Acrididae. The species is endemic to the town of Maspalomas on Gran Canaria Island, and is considered Critically endangered, or almost extinct, since it hasn't been found since 1949.

References

Insects described in 1954
Acrididae
Insects of the Canary Islands
Fauna of Gran Canaria